O16 or O-16 may refer to:
 Curtiss O-16 Falcon, an observation aircraft of the United States Army Air Corps
 Garberville Airport, in Humboldt County, California, United States
 , a submarine of the Royal Netherlands Navy
 Oxygen-16, an isotope of oxygen
 , a submarine of the United States Navy